Marvin Camras (January 1, 1916 – June 23, 1995) was an electrical engineer and inventor who was widely influential in the field of magnetic recording.

Camras built his first recording device, a wire recorder, in the 1930s for a cousin who was an aspiring opera singer named Willy. He also built Willy a telephone, due to the fact that he could not afford one, at the age of 8. Shortly afterwards he discovered that using magnetic tape made the process of splicing and storing recordings easier.

Camras's work attracted the notice of his professors at what is now Illinois Institute of Technology (IIT) and was offered a position at Armour Research Foundation (which merged with Lewis Institute in 1940 to become IIT) to develop his work.

Before and during World War II Camras' early wire recorders were used by the armed forces to train pilots. They were also used for disinformation purposes: battle sounds were recorded and amplified and the recordings placed where the D-Day invasion was not going to take place. This work was kept secret until after the war.

In June 1944 he was awarded , titled "Method and Means of Magnetic Recording". In all, Camras received more than 500 patents, largely in the field of electronic communications.

Camras received a bachelor's degree in 1940 and a master's degree in 1942, both in electrical engineering, from IIT. In 1968, the institution awarded him an honorary doctorate.

In May 1962 Camras wrote a predictive paper titled "Magnetic recording and reproduction - 2012 A.D.". In his paper Camras predicted the existence of mass-produced portable media players he described as memory packs the size of a package of playing cards holding up to 1020 bits of information. Such devices would not have any mechanically moving parts and would store both sound and movies. He also predicted music and movie downloads, online shopping, access to online encyclopedias and newspapers and the widespread use of online banking transactions.

He built his own house, by hand, doing everything except laying the foundation. He also built a bomb-shelter in this house.  
In recognition of his achievements, he received the National Medal of Technology award in 1990.

Marvin Camras died of kidney failure at the age of 79 in Evanston, Illinois.

See also 
 Tape bias

References

External links
https://web.archive.org/web/20031207053754/
http://www.invent.org/hall_of_fame/26.html
http://voices.iit.edu/camrasbio.html

People from Chicago
1916 births
1995 deaths
20th-century American inventors
Illinois Institute of Technology alumni
National Medal of Technology recipients
Deaths from kidney failure
Jewish American scientists
20th-century American Jews